The Memorial Hall of the Victims in Nanjing Massacre by Japanese Invaders is a museum to memorialize those that were killed in the Nanjing Massacre by the Imperial Japanese Army in and around the then-capital of China, Nanjing, after it fell on December 13, 1937. It is located in the southwestern corner of  downtown Nanjing known as Jiangdongmen, near a site where thousands of bodies were buried, called a "pit of ten thousand corpses".

Nanjing Massacre

On December 13, 1937, the Japanese Army occupied Nanjing (then spelt Nanking) – then the capital city of the Republic of China. During the first six to eight weeks of their occupation, the Japanese Army committed numerous atrocities, including rape, arson, looting, mass executions, and torture. China estimates that approximately three hundred thousand civilians and unarmed soldiers were brutally slaughtered.  This estimate was made from burial records and eyewitness accounts by the Nanjing War Crimes Tribunal and included in the verdict for Hisao Tani. Corpses littered the streets and were seen afloat in rivers for weeks, and many structures in the city were burned down. Countless shops, stores, and residences were looted and sacked.

Japanese soldiers were also reported to have conducted killing competitions and bayonet practice using Chinese prisoners.  Approximately twenty thousand cases of rape occurred within the city during the first month of the occupation, according to the "Judgement of the International Military Tribunal". Even children, the elderly, and nuns are reported to have suffered at the hands of the Imperial Japanese Army.

Memorial Hall
The Nanjing Memorial Hall was built in 1985 by the Nanjing Municipal Government in memory of the three hundred thousand victims of the massacre. In 1995, it was enlarged and renovated. The memorial exhibits historical records and objects, and uses architecture, sculptures, and videos to illustrate what happened during the Nanjing Massacre. Many historical items were donated by Japanese members of a Japanese–Chinese friendship group, which also donated a garden located on the museum grounds.

It occupies a total area of approximately twenty-eight thousand square meters, including about three thousand square meters of building floor space.

The memorial consists of three major parts: outdoor exhibits, sheltered skeletal remains of victims, and an exhibition hall of historical documents.

Admission is free. Visitors should prepare themselves for large crowds of people at all times of day.

Outdoor exhibits
The outdoor exhibit include statues, sculptures, relief carvings, tablets, and a large wall listing the names of victims, as well as an atonement tablet and memorial walkway.  The memorial walkway displays footprints of survivors, some of which were impressed as recently as 2002.

Skeletal remains

The skeletal remains of massacre victims, now exhibited in a coffin-shaped display hall, were excavated from Jiangdongmen in 1985; 208 more were uncovered in 1998.

Exhibition hall
The tomb-like exhibition hall, half underground, contains more than 1000 items related to the massacre, including an immense collection of pictures, objects, charts, and photographs. Paintings, sculptures, illuminated display cabinets, multimedia screens and documentary films serve to demonstrate to visitors the crimes committed by the Japanese military. The hall also houses a statue of John Rabe, a German businessman who helped establish the Nanking Safety Zone.

Nanjing Massacre History and International Peace Research Institute
This research institute was established at the memorial hall by the Jiangsu Provincial Government on 1 March 2016.  The superintendent is Xian Wen Zhang, professor of the School of History, Nanjing University. The executive president is Jian Jun Zhang, curator of the memorial hall. It consists of Nanjing Massacre History Research Center, Anti-Japanese War History Research Center, Comfort Women Research Center, Contemporary Japanese Politics Research Center, Peace Studies Research Center, International Peace School and other institutions.

Transportation
The memorial hall is accessible within walking distance west of Yunjinlu Station of Nanjing Metro. Take Line 2 to Yunjinlu Station. Use Exit 2. The entrance to the Memorial Hall is right across the street from the subway entrance.

See also
 Nanjing Massacre Memorial Day

References

Further reading
Memorial Hall of the Victims in the Nanjing Massacre (1937-1938)
Nanjing Massacre Memorial Museum
Kirk A. Denton, Exhibiting the Past: Historical Memory and the Politics of Museums in Postsocialist China (University of Hawaii Press, 2014), pp. 143–49.

External links

Museums established in 1985
Memorial Hall
World War II museums in China
Museums in Nanjing
Major National Historical and Cultural Sites in Jiangsu
Cemeteries in Nanjing
1985 establishments in China
National first-grade museums of China
Genocide museums